is a Japanese actor.

In 1970, he married actress Kiwako Taichi. They later divorced.

Selected filmography

Films

It's Tough Being a Man (1969) as Kawamata Noboru
Tora-san's Cherished Mother (1969) as Kawamata Noboru
Tora-san's Grand Scheme (1970) as Kawamata Noboru
Tora-san's Dear Old Home (1972) as Kawamata Noboru
Tora-san's Dream-Come-True (1972)  as Kawamata Noboru
Hissatsu Shikakenin Baian Arijigoku  (1973)
Pink Lady no Katsudō Daishashin (1978)
Marriage Counselor Tora-san (1984) as Kawamata Noboru
Bloom in the Moonlight (1993) as Sakunosuke Koyama
Agitator (2001)
Izo (2004)
Bunny Drop (2011)

Television
Hissatsu series
Hissatsu Shikakenin (1972–73) as Misaki no  Senzō
Hissatsu Shiokinin (1973) as Ohirome no Hanji
Tasukenin Hashiru (1973074) as Rikichi
Kurayami Shitomenin (1974) as Hanji
Edo no Kaze (1975-1978) as Sanai
Oretachi no Tabi (1975–76) as Kumazawa Shinroku
Oretachi wa Tenshi da! (1979) as Suehiro Teppei
Shūchakueki Series (From ep17-present) as Chief Sakamoto

References

1943 births
Japanese male voice actors
Living people